Thrimolus is a genus of hairy fungus beetles in the family Mycetophagidae. There are at least two described species in Thrimolus.

Species
These two species belong to the genus Thrimolus:
 Thrimolus duryi Casey
 Thrimolus minutus Casey, 1900

References

Further reading

 
 

Tenebrionoidea
Articles created by Qbugbot